Anisophyllea reticulata is a species of plant in the Anisophylleaceae family. It is endemic to Peninsular Malaysia.

References

reticulata
Endemic flora of Peninsular Malaysia
Vulnerable plants
Taxonomy articles created by Polbot